Rutshuru Hydroelectric Power Station, also referred to as Rutshuru Hydropower Station, is a   hydroelectric power station under construction in the Democratic Republic of the Congo. The plant was finished on December 16, 2015.

Location
The power station is located near the town of Rutshuru, in Rutshuru Territory, North Kivu Province, in eastern Democratic Republic of the Congo.

Overview
Rutshuru Power Station is a run of river, mini-hydropower plant, with planned installed capacity of 12.5 Megawatts. It is one of three mini-hydropower stations planned for construction in Virunga National Park, in North Kivu, in eastern DRC. The other two mini hydropower stations are the planned Lubero Hydroelectric Power Station, and Mutwanga Hydroelectric Power Station, which was commissioned in August 2013.

Construction costs
The Howard G Buffett Foundation, an American philanthropic organization, which provided technical and financial support from the beginning of the project, has committed another US$19.7 million towards the completion of the Rutshuru Hydropower Station. Construction began in December 2013 and commissioning is expected in 2016.

See also

List of power stations in the Democratic Republic of the Congo

References

External links
 Approximate Location of Mutwanga Power Station At Google Maps

Hydroelectric power stations in the Democratic Republic of the Congo
North Kivu
Virunga Mountains